= Griesel Fruit Company Building =

Historic building in Portland, Oregon, U.S.

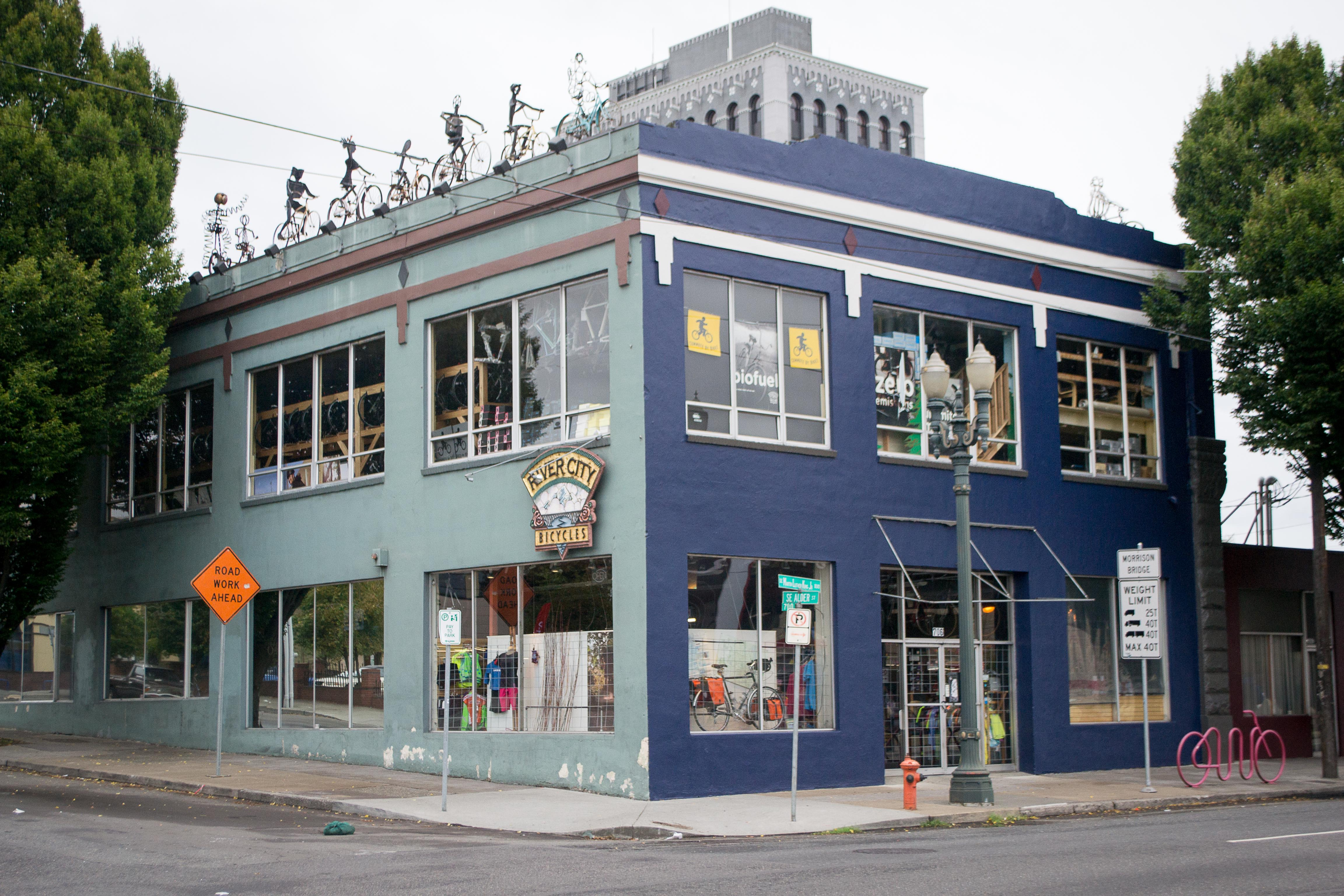
- The building's exterior in 2013
- Interactive map of the Griesel Fruit Company Building area

General information
- Location: Portland, Oregon, United States
- Coordinates: 45°31′4.1″N 122°39′41.3″W

The Griesel Fruit Company Building is a historic building in Portland, Oregon. Completed in 1923, the structure is part of the East Portland Grand Avenue Historic District, which is listed on the National Register of Historic Places.
